Stalag 17 is a 1953 American war film which tells the story of a group of American airmen confined with 40,000 prisoners in a World War II German prisoner of war camp "somewhere on the Danube". Their compound holds 630 Sergeants representing many different air crew positions, but the film focuses on one particular barrack, where the men come to suspect that one of their number is an informant. The film was directed and produced by Billy Wilder who, with Edwin Blum, adapted the screenplay from the Broadway play of the same name. The play was written by Donald Bevan and Edmund Trzcinski, based on their experiences as prisoners in Stalag 17B in Austria.

The film stars William Holden in an Oscar-winning performance, along with Don Taylor, Robert Strauss, Harvey Lembeck, Peter Graves, Neville Brand, Richard Erdman, Michael Moore, Sig Ruman, and Otto Preminger. Strauss and Lembeck appeared in the original Broadway production.

Plot

In a German prisoner-of-war camp named Stalag 17, one of its compounds holds 630 American airmen (all of whom are sergeants) and is overseen by camp warden Oberst von Scherbach.

In December 1944, the men of Barracks 4—led by appointed barracks chief "Hoffy" Hoffman and security officer Frank Price—arrange for the escape of fellow airmen Manfredi and Johnson. The pair are shot dead in the attempt, and the men believe they were betrayed by an informant. Suspicion falls on J.J. Sefton, an enterprising cynic who barters openly with the German guards for various luxuries. He also creates profitable ventures that distract from the mundanity of camp life: from organizing rat races for gambling, to an improvised distillery for brewing alcohol, to a makeshift telescope to spy on the Russian women from a neighboring compound. Clarence "Cookie" Cook, who narrates the story, serves as Sefton's underling.

The men of Barracks 4 do their best to keep sane, which includes enduring the antics of barracks clowns "Animal" Kuzawa and Harry Shapiro and smuggling in a radio to listen in on war news. Their jovial supervisor, Feldwebel Schulz, secretly retrieves hidden messages from a hollow black queen on the chessboard, and straightens the looped cord of a dangling light bulb, which serves as a signal between himself and the informant. Just before Christmas, a recently captured Lieutenant Dunbar is assigned to Barracks 4 until he can be sent to an officers' camp. Sgt. Bagradian, who accompanies Dunbar, reveals that Dunbar rigged a time bomb in transit and blew up a munitions train. Sefton recognizes Dunbar from officers school and believes that he passed only because of his rich family, creating tension between them.

Schulz announces that an inspector from the Geneva Convention will arrive, and Sefton bribes the guards to let him spend the day with the Russian women. The radio is later confiscated by Schulz. Concluding that Sefton was rewarded for revealing the radio, the men confront him when he returns, but Sefton denies he was responsible. Von Scherbach interrupts to arrest Dunbar as a saboteur; the men blame Sefton again and brutally beat him.

The next day, the inspector from Geneva arrives with Red Cross parcels—including 2,000 ping-pong balls, which the prisoners use to create smoke bombs. The inspector is then told about Dunbar, and he warns von Scherbach that Dunbar cannot be convicted without proof, lest there be war crime trials. Von Scherbach hands Schulz a black queen to be delivered to the informant. During the Christmas Eve celebrations, Price stealthily switches out the black queen, reads the hidden message, and then resets the signal. Sefton, recovering from his beating, notices the signal afterwards and becomes suspicious. Price gets Bagradian to reveal the recipe of Dunbar's time bomb: a lit cigarette tucked into a matchbook. That night, an air raid siren forces the men to evacuate. Sefton hides and witnesses Price speaking German to Schulz and demonstrating the time bomb as evidence against Dunbar.

On Christmas Day, the SS arrive to take Dunbar to Berlin. While Hoffy has Price guard Sefton (who is still believed to be the informant), he gathers the men to rescue Dunbar. A riot and an ignited smoke bomb distract the guards, and Dunbar is taken to hide in a latrine's water tower until nightfall. After von Scherbach threatens to raze the camp, the men of Barracks 4 decide that one of them must help Dunbar escape. Price volunteers, and Sefton finally accuses him of being a German spy. Sefton interrogates Price and reveals the messaging system he used; the men are convinced and Price tries to flee, but he is quickly restrained.

Anticipating a generous reward, Sefton decides to rescue Dunbar. He retrieves the Lieutenant, and the prisoners throw Price out of the barracks with cans tied to his leg. Price attracts the spotlights of every guard tower and is gunned down; Sefton and Dunbar escape amidst the chaos. The prisoners return to their bunks, and Cookie whistles "When Johnny Comes Marching Home".

Cast

Production

Original Broadway production
The film was adapted by Wilder and Edwin Blum from the Broadway play by Donald Bevan and Edmund Trzcinski, which was based on their experiences as prisoners in Stalag 17B in Austria. Trzcinski appears in the film as a prisoner.

The play was directed by José Ferrer and was the Broadway debut of John Ericson, as Sefton. It was presented first at the Edwin Burke Memorial Theater of The Lambs, a theatrical club, on March 11, 1951 (staged by the authors). It began its Broadway run in May 1951 and continued for 472 performances. The Sefton character was loosely based on Joe Palazzo, a flier in Trzcinski's prisoner-of-war barracks. The script was rewritten extensively by Wilder and Blum.

Casting
Both Charlton Heston and Kirk Douglas were considered for the role of Sefton.

Location
The prison camp set was built on the John Show Ranch in Woodland Hills, on the southwestern edge of the San Fernando Valley. The shoot began in February 1952, during the rainy season in California, providing plenty of mud for the camp compound. It is now the location of a meetinghouse of the Church of Jesus Christ of Latter-day Saints.

Filming and release
The film was shot in chronological order, an unusual practice because that method is usually much more expensive and time-consuming. In a featurette released later, members of the cast said that they themselves did not know the identity of the informant until the last three days of shooting.

Peter Graves recalled that the film was held back from release for over a year because Paramount Pictures did not believe that anyone would be interested in seeing a film about prisoners of war. The 1953 release of American POWs from the Korean War led Paramount to release it on an exploitation angle.

Reception

Box office
By January 1954, Stalag 17 had earned $3.3 million in theatrical rentals in the United States and Canada.

Critical reaction
Bosley Crowther praised the film, calling it "cracker jack movie entertainment". He praised Wilder and Edwin Blum for having improved the play, and applauded William Holden's performance. Harrison's Reports wrote, "Thanks to the brilliant handling of the subject matter by producer-director Billy Wilder, and to the fine acting of the entire cast, the picture has been fashioned into a first-rate entertainment". William Brogdon of Variety felt "The raucous flavor will set well with male viewers and even the distaffers should find it acceptable entertainment most of the time. William Holden's name heads the good cast...although the lengthy two-hour running time makes for a booking awkwardness when it reaches the regular dual-bill situations in the general runs." Philip K. Scheuer of the Los Angeles Times wrote Wilder "preserved [the] essential humor and tragedy with no dulling of its corrosive edges, though he has cleaned it up in both language and situations. Lustiness has pretty much replaced bawdiness, and while the fun may not yet be all in the "good clean" class, it is at least expressed in the accepted and more palatable Hollywood medium of hard-boiled comedy."

In 2006, film critic James Berardinelli stated that "among the 20th century directors, few were more versatile than Billy Wilder". On Rotten Tomatoes the film has a 91% rating  based on 74 reviews, with an average rating of 8.40/10. The website's consensus states: "Stalag 17 survives the jump from stage to screen with flying colors, thanks to Billy Wilder's typically sterling direction and a darkly funny script." On Metacritic it has a score of 84% based on reviews from 15 critics.

Accolades
William Holden won the Academy Award for Best Actor in a Leading Role. His acceptance speech is one of the shortest on record ("thank you, thank you"); the TV broadcast had a strict cutoff time which forced Holden's quick remarks. The frustrated Holden personally paid for advertisements in the Hollywood trade publications to thank everyone he wanted to on Oscar night. He also remarked that he felt that either Burt Lancaster or Montgomery Clift should have won the Best Actor Oscar for From Here to Eternity instead of him. It is said that he felt he was given the award as consolation for not having previously won it for Sunset Boulevard.

In popular culture
 The television series Hogan's Heroes (CBS, 1965–71) is based on a similar Stalag. Richard Erdman, who played Hoffy in Stalag 17, guest-starred on Hogan's Heroes as Walter Hobson, a reporter who, with Hogan's crew, is freed in the episode "No Names Please".  Erdman is the only star of the movie to have guest starred on Hogan's Heroes.
 "Stalag 17" is a 1973 reggae riddim, composed by Ansell Collins and named after the film.
 The film is parodied in the Ripping Yarns episode "Escape from Stalag Luft 112B" (1977).
 An uncredited William Holden reprised the character of a cigar-chewing POW in the 1979 war movie Escape to Athena. Since he is seen only briefly, it can be presumed that "Sefton" made another successful escape while no one was looking.
 The episode "Did You See The Sunrise?" (1982), of the television series Magnum, P.I., opens with Stalag 17 playing on the TV, as the main character, Thomas Magnum, is watching and remembering his childhood, and the enjoyment he had with the movie, only to grow up and experience his own wartime imprisonment.
 In a 1995, Season 3 NYPD Blue episode entitled "Torah! Torah! Torah!", Stalag 17 was mentioned.
 In the 2008–2015 television series The Penguins of Madagascar, two penguins named Manfredi and Johnson are referenced throughout the show, typically for the nature of their demise or a mistake they made. They actually appear alive in "The Penguin who Loved Me".

References

External links 
 
 
 
 
 

1953 films
1953 war films
American black-and-white films
American films based on plays
American war films
1950s English-language films
Films about Nazi Germany
Films directed by Billy Wilder
Films featuring a Best Actor Academy Award-winning performance
Films scored by Franz Waxman
Films set in 1944
Films with screenplays by Billy Wilder
Military humor in film
Paramount Pictures films
World War II films based on actual events
World War II prisoner of war films
1950s American films